Gandoi is town and union council of Dera Bugti District in the Balochistan province of Pakistan. It has an altitude of 250 metres (823 feet).

References

Populated places in Dera Bugti District
Union councils of Balochistan, Pakistan